Emanuel Mayers (born 9 March 1989 in Lakewood, United States) is a Trinidadian athlete specialising in the 400 metres hurdles. He won several medals on regional medal, including two golds at the 2013 Central American and Caribbean Championships. He competed athletically for Mississippi State University as part of their Mississippi State Bulldogs track and field team.

His personal best in the event is 49.57 seconds (Port of Spain, 2014).

Competition record

References

1988 births
Living people
American sportspeople of Trinidad and Tobago descent
Athletes (track and field) at the 2011 Pan American Games
Athletes (track and field) at the 2014 Commonwealth Games
Athletes (track and field) at the 2015 Pan American Games
Commonwealth Games competitors for Trinidad and Tobago
Mississippi State Bulldogs men's track and field athletes
Pan American Games medalists in athletics (track and field)
Pan American Games gold medalists for Trinidad and Tobago
Sportspeople from Lakewood Township, New Jersey
Track and field athletes from New Jersey
Trinidad and Tobago male hurdlers
Medalists at the 2015 Pan American Games